Henderson Simmons (born 14 December 1941) is a Barbadian cricketer. He played in one first-class match for the Barbados cricket team in 1970/71.

See also
 List of Barbadian representative cricketers

References

External links
 

1941 births
Living people
Barbadian cricketers
Barbados cricketers
People from Saint Michael, Barbados